Bob Berezowitz (born July 8, 1944) is a former American football player and coach. From 1963 to 1966, he was the catcher for the Wisconsin–Whitewater Warhawks baseball team and the quarterback for the Wisconsin–Whitewater Warhawks football team. From 1985 to 2006, he served as the head coach for the Wisconsin–Whitewater Warhawks football team.  During his tenure as head coach, he amassed a record of 158–73–4, with eight conference championships, four NCAA playoff appearances (1988, 1990, 1994, and 2005), and two championship game appearances.  He has been inducted into the UW–Whitewater Athletics Hall of Fame, National Association of Intercollegiate Athletics District 14 Hall of Fame, and the Wisconsin Football Coaches Association Hall of Fame. In September 2012, UW–Whitewater renamed the student athletic complex after Berezowitz.

Head coaching record

References

External links
 Wisconsin Football Coaches Association profile

1944 births
Living people
American football quarterbacks
Baseball catchers
Wisconsin–Whitewater Warhawks baseball players
Wisconsin–Whitewater Warhawks football coaches
Wisconsin–Whitewater Warhawks football players
Sportspeople from Milwaukee
Coaches of American football from Wisconsin
Players of American football from Milwaukee